Black Rain is the debut EP by Black Rain, released in 1992 by Kombinat. The EP was later compiled with other tracks on the 2018 Metal Rain 1989 - 1993 compilation.

Track listing

Personnel 
Adapted from the Black Rain liner notes.

Black Rain
 Stuart Argabright – vocals, effects, percussion
 Chaz Cardoza (as Bones 23) – bass guitar, percussion
 Thom Furtado – drums, percussion
 Shinichi Shimokawa – guitar

Production and design
 William Barg – editing (A1)

Release history

References

External links 
 
 Black Rain at Discogs (list of releases)
 Black Rain at Bandcamp
 Black Rain at iTunes

1992 debut EPs
Black Rain (band) albums